What Will People Say? is a 1916 American silent, black-and-white film directed by film pioneer Alice Guy, produced by Herbert Blaché, and starring Olga Petrova.

Cast
 Olga Petrova as Persis Cabot
 Fritz De Lint as Harvey Forbes
 Fraunie Fraunholz as Willie Enslee
 Jean Thomas as Zoe Potter
 Charles Dungan as Senator Tate
 Zadee Burbank as Mrs. Neff
 Marilyn Reid as Alice Neff
 Elenore Sutter as Michette
 William A. Morse as Murray Ten Eycke
 John Dudley as James Cabot

References

External links
 

Silent American drama films
1916 drama films
American silent films
American black-and-white films
Films directed by Alice Guy-Blaché
Films produced by Herbert Blaché
Films based on works by Rupert Hughes
Films shot in Fort Lee, New Jersey
Metro Pictures films
1910s American films